Carpenter's Station may refer to the following communities:

Carpenter's Station, Alabama
Carpenter's Station, Kentucky
Carpenter's Station, Louisiana
Carpenter's Station, Tennessee
Long Island, Alabama, also known as Carpenters Station

See also
Carpenter station, a railroad station in Philadelphia, Pennsylvania